Realsports Volleyball is a volleyball video game written by Bob Polaro and Jim Huether for the Atari 2600 and published by Atari, Inc. in 1982. Polaro also programmed the Atari 2600 port of Defender.

Development 
RealSports Volleyball is an enhanced version of programmer Bob Polaro's never released game Volleyball. He asked to make several improvements on it, including better animations and more colourful backgrounds. It is part of the RealSports series of games.

Reception
Steve Davidson wrote in Arcade Express in 1983, "Unlike some video volleyball contests, this one really does play like the sport," and called the game "a triumph" (8/10). The game won The Video Game Update magazine's 1982 Awards of Excellence in the "Best New Sports Game" category.

Legacy
The intellectual property rights for the game passed to Hasbro Interactive and were subsequently bought by Infogrames in 2001, which was subsequently renamed Atari SA. It was then re-released for the Atari Flashback 3 in 2011, which was the first console of the Flashback series made by the AtGames company. As of 2021, the game has been included on all subsequent Flashback consoles, including the Flashback 4, 5, 6, 7, 8, 9, and X.

References

External links

1982 video games
Atari 2600 games
Atari 2600-only games
Beach volleyball video games
Multiplayer and single-player video games
Video games developed in the United States